Crombrugghia kollari is a moth of the family Pterophoridae. It is found in Spain, Italy, France, Austria and Switzerland and has also been recorded from southern Russia and Turkey. It is an Alpine species.

It is a little larger than Crombrugghia tristis. It has a very characteristically grey-whitish colour with some specimens being almost white.

The larvae feed on the leaves of Hieracium amplexicaule. Larvae can be found from the beginning of May to the beginning of June.

References

Oxyptilini
Moths described in 1851
Plume moths of Europe
Taxa named by Henry Tibbats Stainton